Thangal Naga may refer to:
 Thangal Naga people (Thangal Nagas, Khoirao Naga people, Khoirao Nagas, Khoirao people) - Thangal people
 Thangal Naga language (Khoirao Naga language, Thangal language) - Khoirao language